The Lisu National Development Party (LNDP) is a political party in Myanmar seeking to represent the interests of the Lisu people. In the 2015 general election, the party won a two seats in both the Pyithu Hluttaw (House of Representatives) and the Shan State Hluttaw (and furthermore, one Ethnic Affair Minister, according official results).

References 

Political parties in Myanmar
Political parties established in 2013
2013 establishments in Myanmar